Pridopidine (also known as PL-101) is an orally administrated small molecule investigational drug. Pridopidine is a selective and potent Sigma-1 Receptor agonist. It is being developed by Prilenia Therapeutics and is currently in late-stage clinical development for Huntington’s disease (HD) and Amyotrophic Lateral Sclerosis (ALS).

Mechanism of Action 

Pridopidine works by binding and activating an intracellular protein called the Sigma-1 receptor (S1R) located at the mitochondria-associated membrane (MAM) of the endoplasmic reticulum (ER). The S1R regulates key cellular processes crucial to neuronal health and survival. Selective activation of the S1R is a promising therapeutic target for treating neurodegenerative and neurodevelopmental disorders.

Pridopidine activation of the S1R demonstrates neuroprotective effects in numerous models of neurodegenerative diseases including HD, ALS, Glaucoma, Parkinson’s disease (PD) and Alzheimer’s disease (AD).  

Pridopidine exhibits a neuroprotective effect against mutant Huntingtin (mHTT)-induced cell death in mouse primary HD neurons and human HD iPSCs. It restores the impaired synaptic plasticity in HD neurons, enhances mitochondrial function, upregulates BDNF transport and secretion, reduces ER stress and restores dendritic spine abnormalities in HD and AD models. In models of ALS, pridopidine protects neuron-muscle connectivity and restores muscle integrity and contractility. These beneficial effects are exclusively mediated by the S1R as either deletion of this gene, or selective inhibition of its function, completely abolish pridopidine’s beneficial effects.

Initially, the primary target of pridopidine was postulated to be the dopamine D2/D3 receptors. However, in-vitro binding assays show that pridopidine has high affinity for the S1R and low affinity for other targets including the dopamine D2/D3 receptors, adrenergic a2C receptor and the Sigma-2 receptor. Furthermore, selective and robust occupancy of the S1R, with no or negligible occupancy of the D2/D3 receptors was demonstrated by in-vivo positron emission tomography (PET) imaging studies in rats and human.

Pridopidine for Huntington’s disease (HD) 
HD is a progressive fatal neurodegenerative disease caused by a mutation in the Huntingtin gene (expanded CAG repeat >35). The disease is characterized by progressive motor abnormalities, cognitive decline, and psychiatric and behavioral symptoms. Adult-onset HD usually begins between 35 and 45 years of age. Following onset, motor, cognitive and functional outcomes steadily decline over 15 to 20 years, ultimately leading to a state of profound incapacity and death. The disease is inherited in an autosomal dominant manner, and thus each child of a parent with HD has a 50% chance of inheriting the mutated HD gene.

For patients and their families, maintaining functional capacity is vital as it translates to a patient’s ability to maintain their occupation, continue to manage their daily lives, and live independently.

In the phase 2, dose finding PRIDE-HD trial, pridopidine 45 mg bid showed a beneficial effect maintaining functional capacity at one year, as measured by the Unified Huntington’s Disease Rating Scale (UHDRS) Total Functional Capacity (TFC). The TFC scale assesses the patient’s ability to perform daily activities. It is a widely validated and regulatory accepted scale to measure clinical disease stage and progression. Pridopidine’s effect on TFC is potentially durable for up to 5 years.

Human PET imaging studies show that pridopidine dose of 45 mg bid (the clinically relevant dose) has selective and robust target engagement of the S1R in the human brain. Extensive safety data indicate this dose has a favorable safety and tolerability profile.

PROOF-HD (Pridopidine’s Outcome On Function in HD) is a global, multicenter, randomized, double-blind placebo-controlled Phase 3 trial evaluating  the effect of pridopidine 45 mg taken twice daily on TFC in patients with early-stage HD (PROOF-HD trial, NCT04556656). This study is ongoing. 499 early HD patients have been enrolled across 59 sites in North America and Europe. Topline data for the PROOF-HD trial are expected by the end of Q1 2023.

Pridopidine for ALS 
ALS is a devastating progressive fatal neurodegenerative disease characterized by upper and lower motor neuron degeneration. Over time this progressive loss of motor function leads to the booklosing the ability to speak, eat, move and eventually breathe.

In 2019, pridopidine was selected by the Sean M. Healey & AMG Center for ALS at the Massachusetts General Hospital as one of the first potential new innovative treatments to be evaluated in the first Platform Trial in ALS −, aimed to  accelerate clinical trials in ALS. The first patient in the pridopidine regimen was enrolled in December 2020 (NCT04615923). The study will enroll 160 patients in each regimen with a 3:1 randomization (120 patients to be treated with pridopidine and 40 patients treated with placebo, daily for 24 weeks).

References

Benzosulfones
D2 antagonists
Huntington's disease
4-Phenylpiperidines
Sigma agonists